The A2 CZ Ellipse Spirit (sometimes spelled Elipse Spirit) is a Czech ultralight aircraft, designed and produced by A2 CZ. The aircraft was introduced at the Aero show in 2011 and is supplied complete and ready to fly or as a kit for amateur construction.

Design and development
The aircraft was designed to comply with the Fédération Aéronautique Internationale rules. It features a cantilever low wing, a two seats in side-by-side configuration cockpit, tricycle landing gear and a single engine in tractor configuration.

The aircraft of all-composite construction. Its  span elliptical wing employs rounded wingtips and fixed slots in the outer portion of the wing and dive brakes.

The basic fixed gear Ellipse was undergoing development in 2011 into a retractable gear version as well as versions for the US light-sport aircraft category.

Specifications (Ellipse Spirit)

References

External links

2010s Czech ultralight aircraft
Single-engined tractor aircraft
Aircraft first flown in 2011